Abyla bicarinata is a colonial siphonophore in the family Abylidae. It was described in 1925.

Description
A wide anterior nectophore with side ridges creates a wing like appearance and providing wing functions. They are also have rounded edges of facets. There is no transverse ridge between the ventral and apico-ventral facets. On the posterior side the nectophore is both the same width and length reinforcing the round and wing shape. They have combs that contain between 4 and 7 strong ostial teeth.

Distribution
The species has been found off the southeast coast of Hawaii at depths below 1000 m during the summer months. It was also spotted off the coast of California at 200 m. Individuals were found in the South China Sea during winter. There are also records from off the coast of California and Hawaii in the upper 200 me of the water column, rarely below 1000 m.

References

Plankton
Species described in 1925
Abylidae
Bioluminescent cnidarians